Saint Francois d'Assise is an oratorio from 1891 by Charles Gounod. The oratorio was considered lost until a manuscript was discovered in a convent in Auvers-sur-Oise.

Recordings
Accentus, Laurence Equilbey. Naïve, sponsored by Palazzetto Bru Zane  2016

References

Oratorios by Charles Gounod
1891 compositions